The K7006/7007 Harbin-Jiamusi Through Train is Chinese railway running between Harbin to Jiamusi express passenger trains by the Harbin Railway Bureau, Harbin passenger segment responsible for passenger transport task, Habin originating on the Jiamusi train. 25B Type Passenger trains running along the Binbei Railway and Suijia Railway across Heilongjiang provinces, the entire 507 km. Harbin Railway Station to Jiamusi Railway Station running 5 hours and 13 minutes, use trips for K7007; Jiamusi Railway Station to Binjiang Railway Station to run 5 hours and 13 minutes, use trips for K7006.

See also 
K7203/7204 Harbin-Jiamusi Through Train

References 

Passenger rail transport in China
Rail transport in Heilongjiang